Alexander Thom (1894–1985) was a Scottish engineer.

Alexander Thom may also refer to:

 Alexander Thom (surgeon) (1775–1845), Scottish military surgeon, judge and political figure in Upper Canada
 Alexander Thom (almanac editor) (1801–1879), Scottish publisher in Ireland
 Alexander Thom (footballer) (1894–1973), Scottish footballer

See also
 James Alexander Thom (born 1933), American author